Wirral Grammar may refer to:

Wirral Grammar School for Boys, England
Wirral Grammar School for Girls, England